The 1922 Fresno State Bulldogs football team represented Fresno State Normal School—now known as California State University, Fresno—during the 1922 college football season.

Fresno State competed in the California Coast Conference (CCC) from 1922 to 1924. The 1922 team was led by head coach Arthur W. Jones in his second year at the helm. They finished as champion of the CCC, with a record of seven wins, one loss and two ties (7–1–2, 2–0–1 CCC). The Bulldogs outscored their opponents 124–51 for the season.

Schedule

References

Fresno State
Fresno State Bulldogs football seasons
California Coast Conference football champion seasons
Fresno State Bulldogs football